Bernard "Boob" Darling (November 18, 1903 – March 5, 1968) was an American football player.  He played his entire five-year career with the Green Bay Packers and was inducted into the Green Bay Packers Hall of Fame in 1970.  Bernard received his nickname from his younger sister who always called him 'Booboo' which was eventually shortened to just 'Boob'.  Darling died at Milwaukee in March 1968, of cancer.

He is the younger brother of Lon Darling, a pioneer in early professional basketball in the United States and founder of the National Basketball League.

Career statistics

References

1903 births
1968 deaths
American football offensive linemen
Green Bay Packers players
Beloit Buccaneers football players
Ripon Red Hawks football players
Sportspeople from Oshkosh, Wisconsin
Players of American football from Wisconsin